Chalice Recording Studio is located in Hollywood, Los Angeles, California, United States. Chalice opened in 2002 and is known for its elaborate interior decor and its large collection of rare and vintage analog recording equipment.

When Chalice founder Ben Tao purchased 845 N. Highland in 2000, he chose to create an environment in which decorative detail could contribute to the artistic process. He wanted clients to be surrounded by amenities that one would normally find in upscale boutique hotels. The interior is influenced by global images and motifs such as photographs by Karl Blossfeld, artistic design from director Tarsem Singh's 'The Cell', imagery from 19th century Indo-Chinese opium dens and the Chalice Well located at the foot of Glastonbury Tor in Somerset, England. Chalice's logo is a mix of the form of a goblet and the blossom of the opium flower.

The first session was with Wyclef Jean. The studio has concentrated on pop music, with artists such as Justin Bieber, One Direction, the cast of Glee, and hip-hop artists Game, Nicki Minaj, Tyler, the Creator, Travis Scott, Diddy, Dr. Dre, T.I., Young Jeezy, and Nas. Albums which have been recorded and mixed at Chalice have achieved gold and platinum status.

References

External links 
 Chalice Recording Studio website

Recording studios in California